Francesco Sabatini (1721 – 19 February 1797), also known as Francisco Sabatini, was an Italian architect of the 18th century who worked in Spain.

Biography
Born in Palermo, he studied architecture in Rome. His first contacts with the Spanish monarchy was when he participated in the construction of the Palace of Caserta for the King of Naples and Duke of Parma and Tuscany, Charles VII, the future King Charles III of Spain. When he was raised to the Spanish throne, he called Sabatini to Madrid in 1760, where he was positioned above the most outstanding Spanish architects of the time. He was appointed as Great Master of Royal Works, with the rank of lieutenant colonel at the Engineers Corps, simultaneously designated also as an honorary academician of the Academia Real de Bellas Artes de San Fernando.

Sabatini's works are all encompassed within the neoclassical tradition, but he was not inspired fundamentally by ancient Greece and Rome, but by Italian Renaissance architecture.

His talent as an architect and the king's support king resulted in many commissions and professional recognition. He was promoted to lieutenant general of the Engineers Corps, was granted the degree of Knight of the Order of Santiago, and had direct access to the innermost royal circle after his designation as gentilhombre de camara (Gentleman of the Royal Chamber).

The  Gardens of Sabatini (located in front of the north facade of the Royal Palace of Madrid, between the Bailén street and the hill of San Vicente) were not designed by him; they were created in the 1930s on the site formerly occupied by the stables constructed by Sabatini.

Furthermore, Sabatini was responsible for building the Arms Factory of Toledo, the headquarters for the Wallon Guarda in Leganés (presently part of the Universidad Carlos III de Madrid), a convent in Valladolid (Santa Ana) and another one in Granada (Comendadoras of Santiago) and the well-known Chapel of the Immaculate in the Cathedral of Osma, also called of Palafox.

He died in Madrid on February 19, 1797.

Works
Among his numerous works the most important were:

Works of the Royal Palace of Madrid until its conclusion (1760–1764).
Planning of the sewage system of Madrid, which was paved with stones and cleaned (1761–1765) for the urban reform of the city of Madrid.
Royal Customs House in the Alcala Street (1761–1769), present seat of the Ministry of Property.
Tombs of Ferdinand VI of Spain and Bárbara de Braganza, located in the Church of Santa Barbara of the Convent of the Salesas Reales, with Francisco Gutiérrez.
Convent of San Pascual, in Aranjuez (1765–1770).
Renovation of Cuesta de San Vicente (1767–1777).
Prolongation of the Southeastern wing of the Royal Palace begins (1772).
Reconstruction of the monastery of the Comendadoras of Santiago (1773).
Puerta de Alcalá (1774–1778).
Direction of works of the Basilica of San Francisco el Grande (1774–1784).
Puerta de San Vicente (1775).
Casa de los Secretarios de Estado y del Despacho, also known as the Palace of the Marquess de Grimaldi and Palace of Godoy (1776).
Continuation of the works of the General Hospital that José de Hermosilla had initiated (1776–1781) during the reign of Ferdinand VI (at the present time the National Museum and Queen Sofia Center of Arts)
Convent of Franciscan of San Gil in the Prado de Leganitos (1786–1797), recently transformed by Manuel Martín Rodriguez.
Change of the direction of the main stairs of the Royal Palace by desire of Charles IV of Spain.
Reconstruction of the Plaza Mayor de Madrid after the 1790 fire, together with Juan de Villanueva.
The project of creating a military base in Leganés. Sabatini planned Cuartel de Saboya's construction. However, the person in charge of building this military complex was José de Hermosilla, who finished it in 1783. Currently, this place belongs to the University Carlos III.

References

External links 

1722 births
1797 deaths
Architects from Palermo
Italian neoclassical architects
18th-century Italian architects